Alexander Edward Chesterman  (born 9 January 1970) is a British Internet entrepreneur, co-founder of ScreenSelect, which would later become part of online film distributor  LoveFilm, and is the founder and CEO of online used car platform Cazoo.

In December 2018 Chesterman raised over £30m in pre-seed funding  and then went on to raise a further round of £50m pre launch for Cazoo. He launched the business in December 2019. In March 2020 he then went on to raise a further £100m for Cazoo. He is also the founder of the property website Zoopla in 2007. Zoopla became digital media business ZPG Plc (LSE:ZPG) a FTSE-250 listed company and owns brands which include Zoopla, uSwitch, PrimeLocation, Money and Hometrack and employs over 1,000 people in the UK. In July 2018 ZPG Plc was bought by US private equity business SilverLake Partners for £2.2bn and delisted from the FTSE 250.

Early life
Chesterman has a bachelor of science degree in Economics from University College London.

Career
Chesterman served as the executive vice president of Planet Hollywood until 1998. He founded ScreenSelect (later LoveFilm) which was subsequently sold to Amazon for £200 million.

In 2007, he founded Zoopla, a property website. In June 2014 he floated Zoopla, which has been renamed and become ZPG, on the London Stock Exchange for nearly £1bn. In 2018 ZPG was sold to US private equity group Silver Lake for £2.2bn. He served as chief executive officer until the end of September 2018 when he stepped down but remains on the Board.

In December 2018, Chesterman announced a funding round of over £30m for his next venture, Cazoo, aimed at transforming the used car market. He has now raised a total of £180m for Cazoo.

He is also regarded as one of the UK's most active tech angel investors and mentors. He has backed early stage digital startups, including Farewill, Graze, Secret Escapes, SportPursuit, UniPlaces, CarWow, Swoon, and Farmdrop and was awarded an OBE for services to digital entrepreneurship in 2016.

He was named Ernst & Young Entrepreneur of the Year in 2013 and in 2017 named on Debrett's 500.

In 2021, his net worth was estimated by the Sunday Times Rich List as £750 million. 

In 2021, Chesterman led investment rounds in checking and digital onboarding platform Thirdfort and DIY and refurbishment platform Lick.

Political activity
In July 2016, Chesterman was said to be behind a legal challenge to stop Brexit should the British government not allow Parliament to vote on the deal. He donated £300,000 to the Liberal Democrats in the 2019 United Kingdom general election.

References

Living people
1970 births
Alumni of University College London
British chief executives
British technology company founders
Officers of the Order of the British Empire
Liberal Democrats (UK) donors
People educated at St Paul's School, London